Emil Godlewski is the name of:
 Emil Godlewski (senior) (1847–1930), botanist
 Emil Godlewski (junior) (1875–1944), epidemiologist